The Arizona–Arizona State men's basketball rivalry is a college basketball rivalry between the University of Arizona Wildcats and the Arizona State University Sun Devils.

History
 

The rivalry dates to 1913, when the University of Arizona in Tucson played the Normal School of Arizona in Tempe – which later evolved into Arizona State University. Since Arizona State became a University in December 5, 1958 Arizona leads ASU 79–58. Before both the schools were affiliated with a conference from 1913−30, Arizona led the series 24−4.  During the Border Conference years from 1931−61, Arizona led 56−31. Upon joining the WAC conference from 1961−1978, Arizona State led that period 22−14.  Since both schools joined the Pac-10 conference in the 1978–79 season & including the Pac-12 Arizona led ASU 65–33.  During the Lute Olson era as head coach from the 1983-84 until the 2006−2007 season Arizona led ASU 43–6.  Sean Miller took over as head coach for the 2009–10 until the 2021–22 Arizona led 17–7.

Beginning in 1928, the rivalry was scheduled on its "traditional" date. Pop McKale, UA's coach and namesake of the present UA stadium, began challenging Arizona for their perennial spot on top of the conference standings. It was officially given the name Territorial Cup in 1939.

The Arizona–Arizona State game has been played in four locations:  Los Angeles, CA, Las Vegas, NV, Tempe, AZ, and Tucson, AZ. Arizona leads the series in all three venues: Tempe, 65–55; in Tucson, 91-31: in Las Vegas, 1-0 and for games contested in Los Angeles, the series is tied at 1–1. Arizona won the last game, played on March 11, 2023, 78-59. Arizona leads the series 159-87, which includes an 80–29 start for Arizona from 1913 to 1958.  Former Arizona head coach Lute Olson amassed a 43-6 record in 25 seasons & former head coach Sean Miller finished with a 17-7 all-time against ASU.

Current Arizona Tommy Lloyd is 4−1 all-time against ASU. Arizona State head coach Bobby Hurley is 4−13 all-time against Arizona.

NCAA Tournament/Postseason NIT

Route to the game

Streaks 
The Arizona–Arizona State rivalry has been known for streaks. In the first major streak of the series, Arizona won 9 straight over the Sun Devils from 1913 to 1926. Arizona has the longest winning streak of the series, 17 games, from 1945 to 1952. The streak was broken by Arizona State in 1952. Arizona State's longest streak was 15 games from 1958 to 1965. Arizona currently has a one game winning streak in the series.

Results

Scores of games (1920–2022)

Achievements by season (1985–2023) 

* This was the last year of a balanced regular season schedule (each team played a home-and-away series with every other conference foe).  In subsequent years, this was not possible due to conference expansion.

Notes

A 2002 Pacific-10 Conference men's basketball tournament
B 2009 Pacific-10 Conference men's basketball tournament
C 2023 Pac-12 Conference men's basketball tournament

† The NCAA tournament was canceled in response to the COVID-19 global pandemic of 2020. The Pac-12 tournament was canceled after the second round after Arizona was defeated Washington in the quarterfinals and Arizona State had yet to play a game.

See also
Duel in the Desert
Arizona Wildcats
Arizona State Sun Devils
Territorial Cup Series

References

College basketball rivalries in the United States
Arizona Wildcats men's basketball
Arizona State Sun Devils men's basketball